A Best Current Practice (BCP) is a de facto level of performance in engineering and information technology. It is more flexible than a standard, since techniques and tools are continually evolving.

The Internet Engineering Task Force publishes Best Current Practice documents in a numbered document series.  Each document in this series is paired with the currently valid Request for Comments (RFC) document. BCP was introduced in RFC-1818.

BCPs are document guidelines, processes, methods, and other matters not suitable for standardization. The Internet standards process itself is defined in a series of BCPs, as is the formal organizational structure of the IETF, Internet Engineering Steering Group, Internet Architecture Board, and other groups involved in that process.  

IETF's separate Standard Track (STD) document series defines the fully standardized network protocols of the Internet, such as the Internet Protocol, the Transmission Control Protocol, and the Domain Name System.

Each RFC number refers to a specific version of a document Standard Track, but the BCP number refers to the most recent revision of the document. Thus, citations often reference both the BCP number and the RFC number.

Example citations for BCPs are: BCP 38, RFC 2827.

Significant fields of application

BCP related to IPv6

BCP related to DNS

BCP related to security

BCP related to globalization

See also
 Benchmarking
 Best practice
 Gold standard (test) 
 Prior art

References

External links
 IETF's BCP Index

Organizational performance management
Standards